The German men's national ice hockey team is the national ice hockey team of Germany and is controlled by the German Ice Hockey Federation. It first participated in serious international competition at the 1911 European Hockey Championship. When Germany was split after World War II, a separate East Germany national ice hockey team existed until 1990. By 1991, the West and East German teams and players were merged into the United German team. The team's head coach is Toni Söderholm.

Germany has won several medals at the World Championships, including two silver medals in 1930 and 1953, as well as a silver medal at the 2018 Winter Olympics, the team's biggest success in the 21st century.

History

West Germany
The West German team's greatest success came in 1976 at the Winter Olympics, when the team went 2–3–0 and won the bronze medal. The Swedish and Canadian teams, traditionally two hockey powerhouses, had boycotted the 1976 Games in protest of the amateur rules that allowed Eastern Bloc countries to send their best players while keeping Western nations from doing the same.

West Germany's wins in the 1976 Games came against the United States (4–1) and Poland (7–4).

In 1980, the team didn't do as well and only won one game in the preliminary round, which kept them from advancing. They finished 10th out of 12.

In 1984, the team was invited to the Canada Cup. By 1991, the reunification of East and West Germany meant the inclusion of players from the former East Germany.

Post-unification
The team is not considered to be as elite as Canada, the Czech Republic, Finland, Russia, Sweden or the United States, but they are ranked 7th in the world (2019) by the IIHF. Since re-unification, their best recent results include finishing 6th place at the 2003 World Championships where they lost a close quarter-final match in overtime to Canada, and 4th at the 2010 World Championships where they lost to Sweden in the bronze medal game. Previously, they finished third in the European Group and qualified for the quarter-finals at the 1996 World Cup after a surprising 7–1 victory against the Czech Republic. In the 1992 Olympics, they lost to Canada 4–3 in an overtime shoot-out in the quarter-finals.

Germany has never won an international competition, and their most recent medal was silver in the 2018 Olympic Winter Games, when they lost to the Olympic Athletes From Russia 4–3 in overtime. It was the first time that Germany had reached the Gold Medal Game at the Winter Olympics. This was their best result, tied with a silver medal at the 1930 World Championships.

There are 25,934 registered players in Germany (0.03% of its population).

Team Germany finished in 4th place at the 2010 IIHF World Championship, their best placement since 1953.

Competition results

Olympic Games

World Championship
1930 – Won 
1933 – Finished in 5th place
1934 – Won 
1935 – Finished in 9th place
1937 – Finished in 4th place
1938 – Finished in 4th place
1939 – Finished in 5th place
1953 – Won 
1954 – Finished in 5th place
1955 – Finished in 6th place
1959 – Finished in 7th place
1961 – Finished in 8th place
1962 – Finished in 6th place
1963 – Finished in 7th place
1965 – Finished in 11th place (3rd in "B" Pool)
1966 – Finished in 9th place (Won "B" Pool)
1967 – Finished in 8th place
1969 – Finished in 10th place (4th in "B" Pool)
1970 – Finished in 8th place (2nd in "B" Pool)
1971 – Finished in 5th place
1972 – Finished in 5th place
1973 – Finished in 6th place
1974 – Finished in 9th place (3rd in "B" Pool)
1975 – Finished in 8th place (2nd in "B" Pool)
1976 – Finished in 6th place
1977 – Finished in 7th place
1978 – Finished in 5th place
1979 – Finished in 6th place
1981 – Finished in 7th place
1982 – Finished in 6th place
1983 – Finished in 5th place
1985 – Finished in 7th place
1986 – Finished in 7th place
1987 – Finished in 6th place
1989 – Finished in 7th place
1990 – Finished in 7th place

European Championship

1912 Championship was later annulled because Austria was not a member of the IIHF at the time of the competition.

World Cup of Hockey
1996 – lost in quarterfinals
2004 – lost in quarterfinals
2016 – Won  (as part of Team Europe)

Canada Cup
1984 – Finished in 6th place

Other tournaments
Deutschland Cup:  Gold medal (1995, 1996, 2009, 2010, 2012, 2014, 2015, 2021, 2022)
Nissan Cup:  Gold medal (1993)

Team

Current roster
Roster for the 2022 IIHF World Championship.

Head coach: Toni Söderholm

Retired numbers
 20 – Robert Dietrich

Notable players

Leon Draisaitl
Rudi Ball
Christian Ehrhoff
Karl Friesen
Marcel Goc
Thomas Greiss
Philipp Grubauer
Jochen Hecht
Dieter Hegen
Gustav Jaenecke
Udo Kießling
Ralph Krueger
Olaf Kölzig
Erich Kühnhackl
Uwe Krupp (also former head coach)
Robert Müller
Helmut de Raaf
Hans Rampf
Dennis Seidenberg
Alois Schloder
Marco Sturm (also former head coach)
Xaver Unsinn (also former head coach)

Uniform evolution

Notable executives
Heinz Henschel, president of the German Ice Sport Federation
Wolf-Dieter Montag, team physician
Roman Neumayer, sport director for the German Ice Hockey Federation

See also
Germany men's national ice sledge hockey team
East Germany national ice hockey team

References

External links

IIHF profile
National Teams of Ice Hockey

 
Ice hockey teams in Germany
National ice hockey teams in Europe